Carl Gottfried Woide (4 July 1725 – 9 May 1790), also known in England as Charles Godfrey Woide, was an Orientalist, a biblical scholar and a pastor.

Career
Woide began his career as a pastor at the Reformed church in Leszno, Poland. In 1750 he transcribed the manuscript of the Lexicon Ægyptiaco-Latinum of Mathurin Veyssière de La Croze in Leiden, which incorporated Sahidic words by Christian Scholtz. Woide learnt Coptic and became an expert in the Sahidic language.

Woide lived in Britain from 1768 until his death in 1790, serving as pastor of the German Reformed Church at the Savoy and the Dutch Reformed Chapel at St James's Palace. He later become a librarian at the British Museum, first in the Department of Natural History, then in the Department of Printed Books, in charge of its Oriental manuscripts. He was one of the first scholars to work on the Egyptian Sahidic texts. He examined the Codex Alexandrinus and the published text of the New Testament from this codex in 1786.

Woide was described in 1782 by C. P. Moritz as living "not far from Paddington, in a very salubrious quarter on the edge of the town, where he breathes cleaner and fresher air than in the city. Although well known as a learned authority on Oriental languages, he is nevertheless a sociable and not unworldly man."

Woide possessed some leaves of a Greek-Coptic diglot manuscript of the New Testament known as the Fragmentum Woideanum. These cover a portion of the Book of Luke. Woide suggested that the fragment was created in the 7th century. The leaves belong to Uncial 070 and other leaves of this manuscript are kept in different locations.

Personal life and legacy
Woide studied in Frankfurt an der Oder and in Leiden, and held a doctorate of divinity from the University of Copenhagen. He was elected a fellow of the Royal Society in 1785, created D.C.L. by the University of Oxford in 1786, and appointed a fellow of many foreign societies. He and his wife had two daughters. He was struck by apoplexy while in conversation at the house of Sir Joseph Banks in 1790, and later died in his rooms at the British Museum.

Woide's papers are held at the British Library. The Fragmentum Woideanum is kept at the Clarendon Press in Oxford.

Works
Lexicon Ægyptiaco-Latinum, 1775.
Grammatica aegyptiaca utriusque dialecti (1778)
Novum Testamentum Graecum e codice ms. alexandrino, London 1786.
Appendix ad editionem Novi Testamenti graeci… in qua continentur fragmenta Novi Testamenti juxta interpretationem dialecti superioris Aegypti quae thebaica vel sahidica appellatur, Oxford 1799.

References

External links
Linnean Correspondence Karl Gottfried Woide to Carl Linnaeus (27 June 1775)

1725 births
1790 deaths
18th-century Polish people
18th-century German people
18th-century British people
Polish librarians
German librarians
British librarians
German biblical scholars
Polish orientalists
German orientalists
British orientalists
Fellows of the Royal Society
British people of German descent
German male non-fiction writers
 Polish Protestants
 Polish Calvinist and Reformed Christians